Estádio Olímpico Monumental (Monumental Olympic Stadium, in English), also known as Estádio Olímpico de Porto Alegre (Porto Alegre Olympic Stadium) and Estádio Olímpico (Olympic Stadium) until 1980, is a football stadium in the city of Porto Alegre, in the Brazilian state of Rio Grande do Sul, with a maximum capacity of 45,000 people. The stadium is owned by Grêmio Foot-Ball Porto Alegrense. Inaugurated on September 19, 1954, the stadium was the home field of the Grêmio football club before being the team moved to Arena do Grêmio in December 2012. Currently, the venue is not in use by the club and suffers from lack of maintenance.

History

The stadium was inaugurated on September 19, 1954, with a maximum capacity of 38,000 people. In 1980, the stadium was expanded, and its capacity increased to 85,000 people. In 1990, the upper ring bleachers were numbered, and the Olímpico Monumental's capacity decreased to 51,081 people.

The inaugural match was played on September 19, 1954, when Grêmio beat Nacional of Uruguay 2–0. The first goal of the stadium was scored by Grêmio's player Vitor.

The stadium's attendance record currently stands at 85,721, set on April 26, 1981, when Ponte Preta beat Grêmio 1–0.

Grêmio won the Copa Libertadores at Estádio Olímpico Monumental on July 29, 1983, after defeating Peñarol from Uruguay in a difficult match.

Grêmio moved from the Estádio Olimpico Monumental to the new Arena do Grêmio on December 8, 2012.

Other uses

The stadium is also used for large concerts. The first concert in the history of the stadium was the former member of the band The Police, the singer-songwriter Sting. For this concert, 60,000 people were at the stadium to cheer him, and it was one of the largest international shows to have passed through the city of Porto Alegre. Two years later, it was time for Rod Stewart to perform at the stadium. Around 30,000 people attended the concert, this one with a less impressive number, considering that the singer performed in Florianópolis in the same week, emptying the show in Porto Alegre. In October 2001, the legend Eric Clapton performed for a fully packed stadium. In 2002, Roger Waters and the band Rush performed at sold-out stadium. The stadium has also hosted  Lenny Kravitz´s concert in 2005, which was also a large audience.

The American singer Madonna performed a sold-out concert to 43.000 crowd at the stadium on December 9, 2012, as part of MDNA Tour,  this one been the last concert on the stadium.

References

Olimpico Monumental
Grêmio Foot-Ball Porto Alegrense
Olimpico Monumental
Sports venues completed in 1954
1954 establishments in Brazil